Josefin Sofia Isabelle Ljungman is a Swedish actress.

Biography 
Josefin Ljungman was born on 26 December 1981 in Gothenburg, Sweden. Since 2005, she has appeared at several theatres including Backa Theater in Gothenburg, Riks Theatre and Dramaten. In 2008, she acted in The Wild Duck directed by Thommy Berggren at the Stockholm City Theater, in which her role was widely appreciated. She also starred in the 2007 film Hata Gothenburg.
In autumn 2009 she took a break from acting and went to Paris for higher studies. In 2010, she starred in the critically acclaimed drama film Himlen är oskyldigt blå and the horror film Psalm 21. In 2012, Ljungman appeared in the Radio Theater Red and Black, directed by Jonas Cornell. In the film I love no one (2012), she plays herself.

Filmography 
 2005 – Kärlek 2000 (shortfilm)
 2005 – Tjejen med videokameran (shortfilm)
 2006 – Bota mig! (TV-series)
 2007 – Arn – Tempelriddaren
 2007 – August (TV-series)
 2007 – Hata Göteborg
 2007 – Pyramiden
 2008 – Fatso
 2009 – Kärlekens krigare
 2010 – Himlen är oskyldigt blå
 2010 – Psalm 21
 2011 – Förväntningar (shortfilm)
 2012 – Mig älskar ingen
 2015 – Boys (TV-series)

References 

Swedish actresses
1981 births
Living people